Rafael Alves de Magalhães Aguiar (born January 18, 1985) is a Brazilian professional footballer who plays as a defender for Florida Tropics SC of the Major Arena Soccer League.

Career
Born in Praia Grande, Alves started his career in Brazil, playing for Ituano, Boa Esporte, and Goias before moving to the United States to play for the Ocala Stampede of the USL PDL. He then signed for the Fort Lauderdale Strikers of the North American Soccer League before the 2013 spring season. He then made his professional debut for the club on August 3, 2013 against the New York Cosmos in which he started as Fort Lauderdale lost 2–1.

After leaving Canada, Alves joined Brazil's Esporte Clube Juventude but only appeared in 2 matches for the club. Unsatisfied with his opportunities, Alves signed with the Major Arena Soccer League's Florida Tropics SC.

In July 2020, Alves signed a new three-year contract to stay with the Tropics. Alves again renewed his contract with the Tropics on August 25, 2022, signing a two-year deal.

Career statistics

Honors

Ottawa Fury 

 NASL Fall Championship 2015

References

External links 
 Rafael Alvez at ZeroZero

1985 births
Living people
Footballers from São Paulo (state)
Brazilian footballers
Fort Lauderdale Strikers players
Association football defenders
North American Soccer League players
Expatriate soccer players in the United States
Ottawa Fury FC players
Florida Tropics SC players
Major Arena Soccer League players
Horizonte Futebol Clube players
People from Praia Grande